Central High School is a public secondary school in St. Joseph, Missouri, United States. The school is part of the Saint Joseph School District.

History
The school was established in March 1861 as St Joseph High School and closed a few months later due to the Civil War.  It re-opened in 1864. It was made to be the hospital for injured people and stashed the bodies on the very top floor and in the tunnels. On May 8, 1895, the cornerstone was laid for a new building at 13th & Olive Street. The building opened on May 6, 1896. In 1907 a second high school was built in the city thus St. Joseph High School was renamed St. Joseph Central High School.  In 1932, a new Central High School was established at 26th & Edmond Street. With a rapidly growing student population, the school expanded in 1961 with a 24-room addition, now called the Sophomore Annex (or Sophomore hallway). In 1968, the 25-room addition now known as the Freshman Annex (or Freshman Building). A bond-renovation project was completed in 2002 that included relocation and centralization of the administrative and counseling offices, as well as the addition of a new media center and library, a gym renovation, and science lab upgrades.

Athletics
Central High School offers a wide variety of sporting activities including:

 Football
 Cross Country (Girls & Boys)
 Basketball (Girls & Boys)
 Swimming (Girls & Boys)
 Wrestling
 Softball
 Golf (Girls & Boys)
 Soccer (Girls & Boys)
 Volleyball
 Tennis (Girls & Boys)
 Baseball
 Track (Girls & Boys)

 Marching band

Notable alumni
 Byron Browne, former MLB player (Chicago Cubs, Houston Astros, St. Louis Cardinals, Philadelphia Phillies)
 Dwayne Blakley, former American football tight end, played professionally for the Atlanta Falcons in the National Football League
 Richard Heinberg, environmental writer

References

External links
 
 St. Joseph School District official website

Buildings and structures in St. Joseph, Missouri
Educational institutions established in 1895
High schools in Buchanan County, Missouri
1895 establishments in Missouri
Public high schools in Missouri